Brave Enough is the third studio album by American electronic musician Lindsey Stirling, released independently on the imprint Lindseystomp Records on August 19, 2016. The album features guest vocalists Christina Perri, Carah Faye, Dan + Shay, ZZ Ward, Raja Kumari, Lecrae, Rivers Cuomo, Rooty and Andrew McMahon in the Wilderness. The album is composed of six instrumental tracks and eight tracks with featured vocalists.

Singles
On June 28, 2016, "The Arena", the first single from the album was released. The music video for "The Arena" debuted the same day.

On July 15, the second single, "Something Wild" featuring Andrew McMahon was released and the music video was released on August 3. "Something Wild" also features as the ending credits song for the Disney film Pete's Dragon.

On August 6, the third single, "Prism", which was produced by Robert DeLong, was released.

The fourth single "Hold My Heart" was released on November 16, 2016. The accompanying video costars Pretty Dudes actor Kyle Rezzarday.

On March 6, 2017, the fifth single, "Love's Just a Feeling" featuring Rooty was released, with the music video released the same day, with cameo appearances by Liev Schreiber, Sarah Jessica Parker, Rachel Bilson and Emilia Clarke.

"The Arena" and "Don't Let This Feeling Fade" (featuring Rivers Cuomo and Lecrae) were used as official theme songs of the 2017 CONCACAF Gold Cup.

Commercial reception
Brave Enough debuted at number 5 on the Billboard 200 chart with 49,000 album-equivalent units (including 45,000 in traditional album sales) in its first week, earning Stirling her second top 10 album. This figure marked the largest sales week for a dance/electronic album since Stirling's previous release, Shatter Me, sold 56,000 upon release in 2014. The album also debuted at  1 on the Top Classical Albums and Dance/Electronic Albums charts, her third consecutive chart-topper on each tally.  Brave Enough won the Billboard Music Award for Top Dance/Electronic Album in 2017.

Track listing 
Note: Stirling sent an exclusive track sang by herself titled "Firefly" to those who pre-ordered Brave Enough via PledgeMusic.

Special vinyl editions
In total, four special edition copies of Brave Enough were released on vinyl.  
Red Swirl Disc Edition
Barnes & Noble exclusive featuring the bonus track "Activate" on a white disc
Urban Outfitters exclusive (limited to 500 copies limited to 500 copies with an autographed postcard
Record Store Day exclusive (limited to 650 copies) signed on gatefold

Charts

Weekly charts

Year end charts

Music videos

References

External links

2016 albums
Lindsey Stirling albums
Universal Music Group albums